Abandoned footwear, such as a lone boot or shoe, has often been noted in out-of-the-way places like ponds or by the side of roads.  Sometimes the shoes may even be new and fashionable.

There are many hypotheses about why this phenomenon seems to more often involve footwear than other types of clothing.  Shoes, being more sturdily constructed than most other types of clothing, will last longer after being abandoned outdoors. Leather shoes, for instance, are estimated to last for 25–40 years outside. Some shoe abandonment is intentional, as in shoe tossing, in which shoes are tied together by their laces and thrown in great numbers into trees, over power lines, or over fences.

Artistic use

Abandoned footwear is a feature in a number of artistic works, including: 

Some artists derive insight and inspiration from abandoned footwear - a form of art known as objet trouvé. 

The lost slipper in the Cinderella folktale is a classic example of the literary device of the "lost object".  

A fisherman hauling up an old boot, rather than a fish, is a comic-strip cliché.  

The theme of abandoned footwear and their untold story is explored in detail in Julie Ann Shapiro's novel, Jen-Zen and the One Shoe Diaries. The titular character describes the phenomenon, “The forgotten shoes are everywhere: littering the side of the highway, floating in the tide, going upstream with the salmon, or occupying a field like a dead body, discarded and left to rot.”

In sport
Leaving behind shoes can be a symbol of retirement in sport. For example, as ESPN's Sherry Skalko describes about Rulon Gardner's last wrestling bout in Athens, Greece: 
An emotional Rulon Gardner prepares to leave his shoes on the mat -- a symbol of retirement.

After the referee raised Gardner's hand in victory -- first to one side of the arena, then to the other -- Gardner grabbed an American flag, wiped away tears and parked himself in the middle of Mat B like "a 33-year-old kid" and took off his size 13 shoes. First the right one, the one that contains the constant reminder of the snowmobiling accident that almost took his life two years ago, then the left.

Then the super heavyweight bronze medalist stood up, bowed his head at each side of the mat and walked off, leaving his shoes behind, a wrestler's signal that he had fought his final bout.

Incidents
An unusual abundance of abandoned shoes was found on Miami's Palmetto Expressway on Friday, 2 January 2009.  Thousands of assorted shoes of all kinds and conditions were scattered across the highway, disrupting traffic for many hours.  The shoes were collected for the charity Soles4Souls which redistributes shoes to needy people.  This unusually large batch of shoes was expected to go to Haiti.

See also
 Shoe tossing, shoes tied by their laces hanging from overhead wires
Ghost shoes (traffic fatality memorial)

References

External links
  The Secret Language of Sneakers, Snopes.com

Footwear
Waste